Zardip's Search for Healthy Wellness was a Canadian educational television show from the 1980s intended to teach public health messages to children. The show's 20 episode arc featured Zardip Pacific, played by Keram Malicki-Sánchez, a robot alien from a planet whose robot inhabitants are breaking down as they do not know how to live a healthy lifestyle. In a top-secret mission, he is sent to the planet Earth to report the habits of humans to his commander Highship. On Earth, Zardip befriends a group of pre-teens who have a special shed called the Healthy Hideaway, where they hang out and talk about healthy stuff, sports and more. They instruct their new odd and strangely clueless friend Zardip on topics ranging from nutrition, to exercise, to germs all the while unaware of Zardip's true alien identity.

The show has a strong cult following around the world for students who attended grade school in the late 1980s and early 1990s, due to memories of watching the videocassettes in class, or watching the shows as they aired on TVOntario.

External links
IMDB entry

1980s Canadian children's television series
TVO original programming
Television shows filmed in Toronto
Health education television series
1988 Canadian television series debuts